Pseudolaguvia tuberculata is a species of catfish from Myanmar.

References

Britz, R. and C.J. Ferraris Jr., 2003. A new species of the Asian catfish genus Pseudolaguvia from Myanmar (Teleostei: Ostariophysi: Siluriformes: Erethistidae). Zootaxa 388:1-8.

Catfish of Asia
Fish of Myanmar
Taxa named by Baini Prashad
Taxa named by Dev Dev Mukerji
Fish described in 1929
Erethistidae